Sorkh Kuh may refer to:
 Sorkh Kuh, Hormozgan
 Sorkh Kuh, Kerman
 Sorkh Kuh, South Khorasan